The Kirk Hotel, in Tooele, Utah, was listed on the National Register of Historic Places in 2020.

It was built during 1927-28 and converted into apartments in 1973.

It was listed as "one of Tooele’s most important historic buildings" built to provide lodging related for a significant local industry, mining and smelting. The structure "was important to small-town life"

References

National Register of Historic Places in Tooele County, Utah

Hotels in Utah
Hotel buildings completed in 1928